Konrad Henryk Wasielewski (born 19 December 1984 in Szczecin) is a Polish rower. He won a gold medal in quadruple sculls at the 2008 Summer Olympics.

For his sport achievements, he received: 
 Knight's Cross of the Order of Polonia Restituta (5th Class) in 2008.

References 

1984 births
Living people
Polish male rowers
Olympic rowers of Poland
Rowers at the 2008 Summer Olympics
Rowers at the 2012 Summer Olympics
Olympic gold medalists for Poland
Sportspeople from Szczecin
Knights of the Order of Polonia Restituta
Olympic medalists in rowing
Medalists at the 2008 Summer Olympics
World Rowing Championships medalists for Poland
European Rowing Championships medalists